The 2013–14 Big Ten men's basketball season began with practices in October 2013, followed by the start of the 2013–14 NCAA Division I men's basketball season in November. Michigan won the regular season title, but lost to Michigan State in the championship game of the 2014 Big Ten Conference men's basketball tournament.

Following the season 9 teams participated in post season tournaments. Six teams were invited to participate in the 2014 NCAA Men's Division I Basketball Tournament; two teams were selected for the 2014 National Invitation Tournament and one team competed in the 2014 College Basketball Invitational. The conference posted a 17–7 record in postseason tournaments. Wisconsin reached the final four of the NCAA Tournament and Minnesota won the NIT Tournament.

Nik Stauskas was the Big Ten Conference Men's Basketball Player of the Year and a 2014 Consensus All-American. Big Ten Defensive Player of the Year Aaron Craft was named the NABC Defensive Player of the Year and Men's Basketball Academic All-American of the Year.

The conference had 7 selections in the 2014 NBA draft, including 5 in the first round: Nik Stauskas (8th), Noah Vonleh (9th), Adreian Payne (15th), Gary Harris (19th), Mitch McGary (21st), Glenn Robinson III (40th), and Roy Devyn Marble (56th).

Preseason

Preseason watchlists
Below is a table of notable preseason watch lists. The Senior CLASS award is only for seniors and the Cousy Award is only for point guards.

Preseason honors
The following players were selected to the CBS Sports, Associated Press, Sporting News, USA Today, USA Today Sports 2013–14 College Basketball Preview Magazine, Blue Ribbon College Basketball Yearbook, Athlon Sports and ESPN preseason All-American teams and the preseason media All-Big Ten team. Preseason All-Big Ten Conference selections are also shown below.

Preseason polls

The official preseason media poll announced by the Big Ten Conference at its October 31 media day conference predicted the order of finish at the top of the conference standings would be Michigan State followed by Michigan and Ohio State.

Several Preseason polls included Big Ten Teams. Sports Illustrated both posted a preseason power ranking and a college basketball preview edition. One of the four regional cover versions featured Harris and Robinson.

Exhibitions
The first conference exhibition game occurred on October 24, when Illinois hosted McKendree University.  In Michigan's second exhibition game on November 4 against  at Crisler Center, the Big Ten Network scheduled it first-ever live Student U telecast on the linear TV network.

Conference schedules
Before the season, it was announced that for the seventh consecutive season, all regular season conference games and conference tournament games would be broadcast nationally by CBS Sports, ESPN Inc. family of networks including ESPN, ESPN2 and ESPNU, and the Big Ten Network. The Big Ten led the nation in attendance for the 38th consecutive season.

Rankings

The Big Ten began the season with five teams ranked and two others receiving votes in the Coaches' Poll. It began the season with 4 teams ranked and two receiving votes in the AP Poll. In the third poll of the season, Michigan State achieved its first number one ranking since the 2000–01 Spartans reached were number 1 on January 2, 2001.

Player of the week
Players of the week
Throughout the conference regular season, the Big Ten offices named one or two players of the week and one or two freshmen of the week each Monday.

Nik Stauskas also earned national player of the week recognition from CBS Sports on January 27.
Stauskas also earned Oscar Robertson National Player of the Week recognition from United States Basketball Writers Association (USBWA) on January 28.
Drew Crawford earned Oscar Robertson National Player of the Week on February 4.

Honors and awards
Aaron Craft and Jordan Morgan were named to the 5-man NCAA Division I Allstate Good Works Team for their commitment to improving their communities and the lives of others. Craft and Drew Crawford were first team Academic All-America selections. Craft was named the Men's Basketball Academic All-America Team Member of the Year. Craft also earned the NABC Defensive Player of the Year award.

Stauskas was a 2014 NCAA Men's Basketball All-American second-team selection by the Sporting News. Stauskas earned third team All-American recognition from USA Today, while Gary Harris and Sam Dekker were honorable mention honorees.  Stauskas was a first team All-American selection by the National Association of Basketball Coaches (NABC). He was also a second team selection by Sports Illustrated and Bleacher Report, as well as a third team selection by NBC Sports. When Stauskas was named second team All-American by the Associated Press, he became a consensus All-American. Harris and Payne where honorable mention AP selections. Stauskas also earned John R. Wooden Award All-American Team recognition.

Watchlists
Keith Appling, Adreian Payne, Aaron Craft, and Sam Dekker were included in the Wooden Award midseason Top 25 watchlist. Appling and Gary Harris were selected to the 23-man Oscar Robertson Award midseason watchlist by the United States Basketball Writers Association (USBWA). Appling, Harris, Nik Stauskas and Roy Devyn Marble were named to the 30-man Naismith College Player of the Year midseason watchlist. Noah Vonleh was selected for the 9-player Integris Wayman Tisdale Award Midseason Watch List by the USBWA. On January 31, Aaron Craft, Drew Crawford, Shavon Shields and Dave Sobolewski were named an Academic All-District by CoSIDA, placing them among the 40 finalists for fifteen 2013–14 Academic All-American basketball selections. On February 12, Craft and Tim Frazier were named two of ten finalists for the Men's basketball Senior CLASS Award. On February 17, Yogi Ferrell, Appling and Craft were among the 23 finalists for the Bob Cousy Award. Although the Big Ten had no finalists for the USBWA's Robertson or Tisdale Awards, John Beilein was one of ten finalists for the USBWA's Henry Iba National Coach of the Year Award. He was also a finalist for the Naismith College Coach of the Year, and Jim Phelan Awards. Tim Miles was also a finalist for the Phelan award. On March 8, Stauskas and Harris were listed among the 15 finalists for the John R. Wooden Award. Craft was one of six Cousy Award finalist.

All-Big Ten Awards and Teams
On March 10, The Big Ten announced most of its conference awards.

34 athletes earned Academic All-Big Ten recognition. Drew Crawford and Tim Frazier earned their fourth Academic All-B1G recognitions, while Aaron Craft earned his third.

NABC
The National Association of Basketball Coaches announced their Division I All-District teams on March 12, recognizing the nation's best men's collegiate basketball student-athletes. Selected and voted on by member coaches of the NABC, 252 student-athletes, from 25 districts were chosen. The selections on this list were then eligible for NABC Coaches' All-America Honors. The following list represented the District 7 players chosen to the list.

First Team
Nik Stauskas, Michigan
Terran Petteway, Nebraska
Gary Harris, Michigan State
Roy Devyn Marble, Iowa
Yogi Ferrell, Indiana

Second Team
Adreian Payne, Michigan State
Drew Crawford, Northwestern
D. J. Newbill, Penn State
Aaron Craft, Ohio State
Keith Appling, Michigan State

USBWA
On March 11, the U.S. Basketball Writers Association released its 2013–14 Men's All-District Teams, based upon voting from its national membership. There were nine regions from coast to coast, and a player and coach of the year were selected in each. The following lists all the Big Ten representatives selected within their respective regions.

District II (NY, NJ, DE, DC, PA, WV)
None Selected
District V (OH, IN, IL, MI, MN, WI)
Player of the Year
Nik Stauskas, Michigan
Coach of the Year
John Beilein, Michigan
All-District Team
Aaron Craft, Ohio State
Sam Dekker, Wisconsin
Yogi Ferrell, Indiana
Gary Harris, Michigan State
Frank Kaminsky, Wisconsin
Caris LeVert, Michigan
Adreian Payne, Michigan State
Nik Stauskas, Michigan

District VI (IA, MO, KS, OK, NE, ND, SD)
Roy Devyn Marble, Iowa
Terran Petteway, Nebraska

Postseason

Big Ten tournament

  March 13–16, 2014 Big Ten Conference men's basketball tournament, Bankers Life Fieldhouse, Indianapolis.

NCAA tournament

The Big Ten Conference had six bids to the 2014 NCAA Men's Division I Basketball Tournament. However, the conference endured its 14th consecutive season without winning the tournament.

National Invitation tournament 

Minnesota won the National Invitation Tournament for the third time in school history.

College Basketball Invitational

2014 NBA draft

The following all-conference selections were listed as seniors: Roy Devyn Marble, Adreian Payne, Aaron Craft, Tim Frazier, and Drew Crawford.

Players who have declared for the 2014 draft lose their NCAA eligibility on April 15, 2014, although players with eligibility remain eligible to declare for the draft until April 27. At the close of business on April 15, the Big Ten Network sent a tweet of tweets that listed the following individuals as having declared for the draft: Noah Vonleh, LaQuinton Ross, Gary Harris, Nik Stauskas and Glenn Robinson III. Mitch McGary eventually joined the list of early entrants.

Marble, Payne, Craft and all six early entrants were selected to receive invitations to the NBA Draft Combine. Seven Big Ten athletes were selected and five were selected in the first round. That was the most first rounders since the 1990 NBA draft and the most overall since the 2000 NBA draft when 8 players were drafted.

References